Iron Branch is a  long 2nd order tributary to Whartons Branch, in Sussex County, Delaware.

Variant names
According to the Geographic Names Information System, it has also been known historically as:  
Duck Head Creek

Course
Iron Branch is formed at the confluence of Wiley Branch Ditch and Houston-Thorogood Ditch about 0.5 miles west-southwest of Phillips Hill in Sussex County, Delaware.  Iron Branch then flows generally northeast to meet Whartons Branch at Riverview, Delaware.

Watershed
Iron Branch drains  of area, receives about 45.0 in/year of precipitation, has a topographic wetness index of 834.86 and is about 5.6% forested.

See also
List of rivers of Delaware

References 

Rivers of Delaware